John Charles Galliano  (born 28 November 1960) is a British fashion designer from Gibraltar. He was the creative director of his eponymous label John Galliano and French fashion houses Givenchy and Dior. Since 2014, Galliano has been the creative director of Paris-based fashion house Maison Margiela. Galliano has been named British Designer of the Year four times. In a 2004 poll for the BBC, he was named the fifth most influential person in British culture.

Early life and education 
Galliano was born in Gibraltar to a Gibraltarian father of Italian descent, Juan Galliano, and a Spanish mother, Anita Galliano, and has two sisters. His father worked as a plumber. His family moved to England when Galliano was six, settling in Streatham and later Dulwich and Brockley in South London. He was raised in a strict Catholic family.

Galliano attended St. Anthony's Primary School, Dulwich and Wilson's Grammar School in London. He went on to study at Central Saint Martins and graduated in 1984 with a first class honours degree in Fashion Design. His graduating collection was inspired by the French Revolution and entitled Les Incroyables. The collection received positive reviews and was bought in its entirety for resale in the London fashion boutique Browns.

Career

Early career and the John Galliano label

London
Galliano then started his own eponymous label alongside long-term collaborators Amanda Harlech, at that time stylist with Harpers and Queen, and Stephen Jones, a milliner. On the back of this success, Galliano rented studio space in London. Initially, financial backing came from Johan Brun, and when this agreement came to an end, Danish entrepreneur Ole Peder Bertelsen, owner of firm Aguecheek, who were also backing Katharine Hamnett at the time, took over. This agreement ended in 1988 and he went bankrupt after his own London-based label failed.

Paris
In 1989, Galliano moved to Paris in search of financial backing and a strong client base. Galliano secured the backing of Paris-based Moroccan designer Faycal Amor (owner and creative director of fashion label Plein Sud) who invited him to set up his base in Paris at the Plein Sud headquarters. His first show was in 1989 as part of Paris Fashion Week.

Media fashion celebrity Susannah Constantine has worked for Galliano, and he has also aided the future success of other designers including shoe designer Patrick Cox. In 1991, he collaborated with Kylie Minogue, designing the costumes for her Let's Get to It Tour.

In 1993, Galliano's financial agreement with Amor ended and he did not have a showing in October, missing the season. With the help of American Vogue editor-in-chief Anna Wintour and André Leon Talley, then European correspondent at Vanity Fair, Galliano was introduced to Portuguese socialite and fashion patron São Schlumberger and financial backers of venture firm Arbela Inc, John  and Mark Rice. It was through this partnership that Galliano received the financial backing and high society stamp needed to give him credibility in Paris. This collection was important in the development of Galliano as a fashion house, and is regarded as a 'fashion moment' in high fashion circles.

Givenchy
In July 1995, he was appointed as the designer of Givenchy by Bernard Arnault, owner of luxury goods conglomerate LVMH. On 21 January 1996, Galliano presented his first couture show at the helm of Givenchy at the Stade de France. The collection received high praise within the fashion media. Some of Galliano's designs for Givenchy were licensed to Vogue Patterns. He was then moved to Dior by LVMH, and succeeded at Givenchy by Alexander McQueen.

Dior

In October 1996, LVMH moved Galliano to Christian Dior, replacing Italian designer Gianfranco Ferré. At Dior, Galliano received widespread critical acclaim for his Haute Couture and ready-to-wear collections, for the whole duration of his tenure there.

Galliano designed the chinoiserie chartreuse gown worn by Nicole Kidman at the 69th Academy Awards in 1997.

In 2010, Galliano identified his love of theatre and femininity as central to his creations; he said "my role is to seduce", and credited Standard Oil heiress Millicent Rogers as an influence.

Anti-semitic incident and firing

In December 2010, a drunken Galliano insulted a group of Italian women in Paris with anti-semitic slurs, which was caught on camera. The video resurfaced in February 2011, just before Paris Fashion Week Autumn/Winter 2011/2012. Facing public and legal scrutiny, he was fired from his role as creative director at Dior.

Oscar de la Renta
In 2013, a Guardian article describing Galliano's incident claims "fashion forgave John Galliano" due to his "two years' exile" and "several statements expressing his sorrow and self-disgust."

In early 2013, Galliano accepted an invitation from Oscar de la Renta, brokered by Anna Wintour, for a temporary residency at de la Renta's design studio to help prepare for a showing of his Fall 2013 ready-to-wear collection during February New York Fashion Week. Galliano also received a measure of absolution from the Anti-Defamation League, which lauded his efforts to atone for his misdeeds and wished him well. The ADL again came to his defence after the New York Post ran a photo of him on his way to the de la Renta show dressed in what it claimed was Hasidic-like garb.

Galliano remained backstage at the show, which received favourable reviews amid speculation about his future, including as a possible successor to Oscar de la Renta and that Galliano might take up a teaching post at Parsons The New School for Design. On 12 June 2013, Galliano's first filmed interview since his dismissal from Christian Dior was broadcast on United States television.  He closed this conversation by stating, "I am able to create.  I am ready to create... [and] I hope through my atonement I'll be given a second chance."

Maison Margiela
On 6 October 2014, the OTB Group announced that John Galliano had joined Maison Margiela to take the responsibility of the creative direction of the house, marking the designer's return to a leading role in designing luxury fashion. Just a few weeks later, on the occasion of the annual British Fashion Awards, Galliano presented the Outstanding Achievement Award to Anna Wintour who wore Galliano's first creation for Maison Martin Margiela, "an unambiguous fashion blessing" from the Editor in Chief of American Vogue according to Vanessa Friedman, Fashion Director of the New York Times.

Galliano exhibited his first couture collection for Margiela during London Collections: Men, on 12 January 2015.  He told French Elle in 2018 that he would stop using fur in his collections, citing as inspiration from a meeting with Penélope Cruz and PETA's Dan Matthews.

On 26 September 2018, Galliano made a statement in Paris at his Maison Margiela show, when he unveiled Mutiny, his first perfume for the fashion house. The perfume is a reflection of his vision of the Maison Margiela women.

Controversies

Antisemitic outburst
Circa December 2010, a drunken Galliano insulted a group of Jewish women in Paris bar La Perle, saying: "I love Hitler... People like you would be dead. Your mothers, your forefathers would all be fucking gassed." The video resurfaced in February 2011, just before Paris Fashion Week Autumn/Winter 2011/2012.

On 25 February 2011, Dior announced their suspension of Galliano including the following statement:Because of the particularly odious character of the behaviour and comments made by John Galliano in a video made public on Monday, the Dior house decided to suspend him immediately and has engaged in a process to dismiss him.The show-business industry expressed mixed feelings towards the designer's anti-semitic speech. Natalie Portman, who had an endorsement contract with Dior, said she was "deeply shocked" by Galliano's comments and that "these still-existing prejudices... are the opposite of all that is beautiful" and "As an individual who is proud to be Jewish, [she] will not be associated with Mr. Galliano in any way." However, another model for Dior, French model and actress Eva Green, said of the incident: "Sometimes, you can make mistakes. I don't think he's antisemitic. I'm Jewish. I don't think he has anything against the Jews. I think it's more that he was probably a bit drunk."

Galliano denied the allegations through his lawyer, and launched a defamation lawsuit against the couple accusing him of antisemitism. On 1 March 2011, Dior announced that it had begun procedures of dismissal for Galliano, with Dior's chief executive Sidney Toledano stating, "I very firmly condemn what was said by John Galliano." Dior announced it will continue to support the Galliano brand financially due to licence despite the scandal, and Bill Gaytten would replace John Galliano as creative director at the helm of Dior and the Galliano brand.

In France, the expression of anti-semitic ideas is illegal. It was reported on 2 March 2011 that Galliano was to face trial in Paris for allegedly making anti-semitic comments to two fellow customers in a café.  The trial commenced on 22 June 2011. Galliano's lawyer argued that the "series of public outbursts during which he uttered racist and anti-Semitic insults in a Paris café" were the result of "work-related stress and multiple addictions."

On 8 September 2011, Galliano was found guilty of making anti-semitic remarks and sentenced to a total of €6,000 in suspended fines.

Subsequent legal action

On 21 November 2013, the Paris Court of Appeals rejected an appeal by Christian Dior Couture SA, which was seeking to move the case to a commercial court from the Conseil de prud’hommes (Labour Court) and ordered Christian Dior Couture SA and John Galliano SA each to pay Galliano €2,500 and court costs. Galliano had been  "seeking compensation in the range of 6 million euros".

Honours
 British Designer of the Year (1987, 1994, 1995, 1997). In 1997, he shared the award with Alexander McQueen, his successor at Givenchy.
 Commander of the Order of the British Empire in the 2001 Birthday Honours List for his services to the Fashion Industry as a Fashion Designer. He received his CBE on 27 November 2001 at Buckingham Palace in London, England.
 RDI for his contribution to the fashion industry (2002).
 Appearance on The Independent on Sunday's 2007 "pink list" for being one of "the most influential gay people in Britain."
 French Legion of Honour (2009). The medal was withdrawn by decree of the president of the Republic, François Hollande, published in the official journal on 20 August 2012.

Personal life 
In interviews, Galliano has given his full name as Juan Carlos Antonio Galliano-Guillén. He had a relationship with fellow Central St Martins student and fashion designer John Flett (1963–1991), whom he described as his soulmate. Galliano currently shares his Paris home with his long-term partner Alexis Roche, a style consultant. He is vegetarian for health reasons, telling French Elle that "The energy that I get from having fewer toxins in my body is extraordinary."

References

External links 

 Official website of John Galliano S.A., a company that no longer employs Mr. Galliano

1960 births
Living people
Alumni of Central Saint Martins
British fashion designers
British people of Gibraltarian descent
British people of Italian descent
British people of Spanish descent
Commanders of the Order of the British Empire
Creative directors
Gibraltarians
High fashion brands
LGBT fashion designers
British LGBT artists

People of Ligurian descent
Dior people
Fashion designers from Paris